John Christopher Milloy (born June 29, 1965) is a former politician in Ontario, Canada. He was a Liberal member of the Legislative Assembly of Ontario from 2003 to 2014 who represented the riding of the Kitchener Centre. He served as a cabinet minister in the government of Dalton McGuinty and Kathleen Wynne.

Background
Milloy obtained a Bachelor of Arts degree from Carleton University, a Master of Arts degree in International History from the London School of Economics, and a Doctorate in Modern History from Oxford University.  He worked at the Centre for International Governance Innovation in Waterloo, Ontario. He was a legislative assistant to Prime Minister of Canada Jean Chrétien from 1997 to 2002, and also worked as an assistant to Stéphane Dion, John Manley and Yvonne O'Neill. He is married to Sara Pendergast, an emergency room physician.

Milloy has written a book titled The North Atlantic Treaty Organization, 1948-1957: Community or Alliance? published by McGill-Queen's University Press on June 1, 2006.

Politics
In the 2003 provincial election he ran as the Liberal candidate in the riding of Kitchener Centre. He defeated incumbent Progressive Conservative Wayne Wettlaufer by 2,160 votes.  On October 23, 2003, Milloy was named parliamentary assistant to Premier Dalton McGuinty in the latter's secondary capacity as the Minister of Intergovernmental Affairs, and continued under new minister Marie Bountrogianni. He served in this position until November 2006, when he was appointed parliamentary assistant to Minister of Training, Colleges and Universities Chris Bentley.

He was re-elected in the 2007 provincial election and he was appointed to Cabinet as Minister of Training, Colleges and Universities. In a cabinet shuffle on June 24, 2009, he was given additional responsibilities as Minister of Research and Innovation. After the 2011 election, he was moved to the position of Minister of Community and Social Services and named Government House Leader.

In Kathleen Wynne's government, Milloy served as Government House Leader and was appointed the Minister of Government Services in February 2013.

In early 2014, Milloy announced that he would retire from politics. He did not run in the 2014 provincial election.

Cabinet posts

After politics
In March 2015, Milloy joined Wilfrid Laurier University as an assistant professor to teach politics and public ethics.

Electoral record

References

External links

Carleton University alumni
1965 births
Alumni of the London School of Economics
Alumni of the University of Oxford
Living people
Members of the Executive Council of Ontario
Politicians from Kitchener, Ontario
Ontario Liberal Party MPPs
21st-century Canadian politicians